Keith Graeme Hamilton (born 9 May 1936 in Ballarat, Victoria) is the former Labor Party member for Morwell in the Victorian Legislative Assembly.

Hamilton served as the Member for Morwell from October 1988 until being succeeded by fellow Labor Party member Brendan Jenkins, in November 2002.

Hamilton served in the Bracks Government's first term as Minister for Agriculture and Minister for Aboriginal Affairs

Hamilton attended Ballarat Teachers' College, a predecessor institution of the University of Ballarat, graduating in 1955. He sat on the Ballarat Teachers' College Library Group Committee, the Sports Committee and won awards for football and athletics in 1955.

References

1936 births
Living people
Australian Labor Party members of the Parliament of Victoria
People from Ballarat
Members of the Victorian Legislative Assembly
21st-century Australian politicians
Victorian Ministers for Agriculture